The Skinpah (also known as the Skeen, Skin, or Shutes) were a Sahaptin people living along the northern bank of the Columbia River in what is now south-central Washington. They were first recorded as the Eneeshurs in 1805 by Lewis and Clark, with the first reference to the Skeen name in the form of an 1847 Paul Kane painting titled Mancemuckt, Chief of the Skeen. Their chief village, Sk'in, was located directly across the Columbia from Celilo Falls, adjacent to the Wishram.

They were signatories of the Yakama Treaty of 1855, and were moved onto the Yakama Reservation. As a result, the Skinpah are no longer recognizable as a separate tribal group.

Notes 

Native American tribes in Washington (state)
Yakama